Gerard Fraser (born 5 November 1978) in Rangiora, New Zealand is a rugby union player who currently plays at fly-half for the Union Bordeaux Bègles in the Top 14.

With stiff competition coming from the likes of Andrew Mehrtens, Aaron Mauger and Dan Carter for the Crusaders, he decided to go into exile in Europe where he started with the Italian club Rugby Calvisano.

He signed with Rugby Calvisano in 2002 where he played a vital part in their domestic title (Coppa Italia) win in 2003 and also their winning of the Super 10 in 2005 & 2008.

From there he played two season for Aviron Bayonnais before moving to L'Aquila Rugby in 2009, where he scored 160 points in 13 games (including 6 tries).

In April 2010, it was announced that he had signed to the French Pro D2 team, Union Bordeaux Bègles. In the 2010–11 Rugby Pro D2 season, he constantly remained in the top 5 point scorers in the competition reaching over 320 points as Bordeaux won promotion to the Top 14.

References

1978 births
Living people
New Zealand rugby union players
Rugby union fly-halves
Rugby union players from Rangiora